Pinchas Zukerman  (born 16 July 1948) is an Israeli-American violinist, violist and conductor.

Life and career

Zukerman was born in Tel Aviv, to Jewish parents and Holocaust survivors Yehuda and Miriam Lieberman Zukerman. He began his musical studies at age four, on the recorder.  His father then taught him to play the clarinet and then the violin at age eight. Early studies were at the Samuel Rubin Academy of Music (now the Buchmann-Mehta School of Music). Isaac Stern and Pablo Casals learned of Zukerman's violin talent during a 1962 visit to Israel. Zukerman subsequently moved to the United States that year to study at the Juilliard School under Stern and Ivan Galamian. He made his New York City debut in 1963. In 1967, he shared the Leventritt Prize with the Korean violinist Kyung-wha Chung. His 1969 debut recordings of the concerti by Tchaikovsky (under the direction of Antal Dorati, with the London Symphony Orchestra) and Mendelssohn (with Leonard Bernstein and the New York Philharmonic) launched a successful recording career of over 110 releases.

Zukerman launched his conducting career in 1970 with the English Chamber Orchestra, and served as director of London's South Bank Festival from 1971 to 1974. In the US, Zukerman was music director of the Saint Paul Chamber Orchestra from 1980 to 1987. He later directed the summer festivals of the Dallas Symphony Orchestra (1991–95) and the Baltimore Symphony Orchestra (1996–99). In 1999, he became Music Director of Canada's National Arts Centre Orchestra (NACO) in Ottawa, stepping down from the post in 2015. He has served as Principal Guest Conductor of the Royal Philharmonic Orchestra since 2009.

Zukerman is on the faculty at the Manhattan School of Music and is the head and founder of the Zukerman Performance Program at the school. His former students include Koh Gabriel Kameda, Julian Rachlin, and Guy Braunstein. In 1999 he founded the National Arts Centre Young Artists Programme, which counts young musicians such as Viviane Hagner, Jessica Linnebach, and Antal Szalai as alumni. In 2006 Zukerman began his involvement in the Rolex Artistic Mentorship programme.

Zukerman plays the "Dushkin" Guarneri del Gesù violin of 1742. His honors include the King Solomon Award, the National Medal of Arts (presented by President Reagan in 1983), the Isaac Stern Award for Artistic Excellence, and an honorary doctorate from Brown University.

Personal life
Zukerman married Eugenia Rich in 1968. The couple had two daughters together, opera singer Arianna Zukerman and blues/folk musician Natalia Zukerman. They frequently appeared together in concert until their separation in 1983. Zukerman was then married to actress Tuesday Weld from 1985 to 1998. He and Weld owned homes in Santa Fe, New Mexico and Montauk, New York, which they bought after the murder-suicide of its previous owners, soap opera actress Gwyda Donhowe and Broadway producer Norman Kean. Zukerman and his third wife, cellist Amanda Forsyth, have been married since 2004 and primarily reside in Manhattan. They often appear as soloists together.

Recordings
His recordings have received 21 Grammy nominations, and two Grammy wins.  He has collaborated with filmmaker Christopher Nupen on several projects, and was the subject of Nupen's "Pinchas Zukerman: Here to Make Music" documentary of 1974. In 2003 he founded a string quintet, the Zukerman Chamber Players, which has released three CD recordings in addition to its roster of live performances.

Discography
2015: Brahms: Double concerto - Symphony No. 4 (Analekta), AN2 8782
2016: Baroque Treasury (Analekta), AN2 8783
2016: Vaughan Williams & Elgar - Royal Philharmonic Orchestra (Decca)

References

Sources
Boris Schwarz: Great Masters of the Violin. From Corelli and Vivaldi to Stern, Zukerman and Perlman. Simon and Schuster, New York 1983.
Darryl Lyman: Great Jews in Music. J. D. Publishers, Middle Village, NY 1986.
Stanley Sadie, H. Wiley Hitchcock (Ed.): The new Grove dictionary of American music.  Grove's Dictionaries of Music, New York, N.Y 1986.
Kurtz Myers: Index to record reviews 1984-1987. G.K. Hall, Boston, Ma. 1989.
Alan Rich: Masters of Music: Great artists at work. Preface by Nicolas Slonimsky, foreword by Isaac Stern, photographs by James Arkatov. Capra Press, Santa Barbara, Ca. 1990.

External links

Profile at New York Philharmonic
Profile at Canada's National Arts Centre Orchestra

Israeli classical violinists
Male classical violinists
Israeli classical violists
Israeli conductors (music)
Jewish classical violinists
Jewish American classical musicians
Jewish Israeli musicians
Manhattan School of Music faculty
Leventritt Award winners
Grammy Award winners
Honorary Members of the Royal Academy of Music
Juilliard School alumni
Fiorello H. LaGuardia High School alumni
Israeli people of Polish-Jewish descent
Performing arts pages with videographic documentation
1948 births
Living people
21st-century conductors (music)
21st-century classical violinists
21st-century American male musicians
21st-century American Jews
Deutsche Grammophon artists
Angel Records artists
RCA Records artists
Philips Records artists
21st-century American violinists